State Penitentiary or State Pen may refer to one of various active and former penitentiaries within the United States:

Anamosa State Penitentiary in Anamosa, Iowa
Brushy Mountain State Penitentiary in Morgan County, Tennessee
Colorado State Penitentiary
Eastern State Penitentiary in Philadelphia, Pennsylvania
Fox River State Penitentiary, a fictional penitentiary in the television series Prison Break
Old Idaho State Penitentiary
Iowa State Penitentiary
Kentucky State Penitentiary
Louisiana State Penitentiary
Mississippi State Penitentiary
Missouri State Penitentiary
Nebraska State Penitentiary
Penitentiary of New Mexico, also referred to as the New Mexico State Penitentiary
North Dakota State Penitentiary
Ohio State Penitentiary
the defunct Ohio Penitentiary
Oklahoma State Penitentiary
Oregon State Penitentiary
Río Piedras State Penitentiary in Puerto Rico
South Dakota State Penitentiary
Washington State Penitentiary
West Tennessee State Penitentiary
West Virginia State Penitentiary in Moundsville, West Virginia
Wetumpka State Penitentiary, formerly Alabama State Penitentiary

Film
State Penitentiary (film), a 1950 drama directed by Lew Landers

See also
List of United States state prisons